Hugh Zachary (January 12, 1928 - September 5, 2016) was an American novelist who has written science fiction novels under the pseudonyms Zach Hughes and Evan Innes (the latter for the America 2040 series). His other pseudonyms include Peter Kanto and Pablo Kane. He describes himself as "the most published, underpaid and most unknown writer in the U.S."

Some of his novels appear to be set in a shared universe, one where Earth experiences a nuclear apocalypse shortly after launching a colonization fleet to settle new worlds among the stars.

Biography

Zachary was born in Holdenville, Oklahoma on January 12, 1928. He received his education from the University of North Carolina at Chapel Hill. He served in the U.S. Army and worked in broadcast journalism in Florida. Zachary started writing as a full-time occupation along with his wife Elizabeth in 1963.

Works
 One Day In Hell (1961, Hugh Zachary) Novel Books
 A Feast Of Fat Things (1968) Harris-Wolfe
 Second Chance (1976) Major Books 
 Desert Battle (1983) Dell 
 Bitter Victory (1983) Dell 
 The Venus Venture (1986, Hugh Zachary) Vanguard  (Crime / Mystery genre)

Science fiction 
Near all of Hugh Zachary's science fiction stories were written under the pseudonym Zach Hughes. The exceptions have the name used listed after the publication date. For example, The World where Sex was Born was written using the pseudonym Peter Kanto.

 The World where Sex was Born (1968, Peter Kanto) Ophelia Press OPH-123
 Rosy Cheeks (1969, Peter Kanto) Bee-Line
 A Dick for All Seasons (1970, Pablo Kane) Ophelia Press OPH-206
 Gwen, in Green (1974, Hugh Zachary) Fawcett Gold Medal M2982
 Seed of the Gods (1974) Berkley Medallion 
 Tide (1974) Berkley/Putnam 
 The Stork Factor (1975) Berkley Medallion 
 The St. Francis Effect (1976) Berkley Medallion 
 For Texas and Zed (1976) Popular Library 
 Tiger in the Stars (1976) Laser Books 
 Pressure Man (1980) Signet / New American Library 
 Sundrinker (1987) DAW Books 
 Life Force (1988) DAW Books 
 The Revenant (1988, Hugh Zachary) Onyx / New American Library

Thunderworld science fiction series 
 The Book of Rack the Healer (1973, Zach Hughes) Award Books AN1149
 The Legend of Miaree (1974) Ballantine Books 
 Killbird (1980) Signet / New American Library 
 Thunderworld (1982, Zach Hughes) Signet / New American Library 
 Gold Star (1983) Signet / New American Library 
 Closed System (1986) Signet / New American Library 
 The Dark Side (1987) Signet / New American Library 
 Mother Lode (1991) DAW Books 
 Deep Freeze (1992) DAW Books 
 The Omnificence Factor (1994) DAW Books 

NOTE: The Thunderworld series shares a common history, stellar cartography, and sometimes characters.

America 2040 science fiction series 
The America 2040 series was written using the pseudonym Evan Innes.
 America 2040 (1986) Bantam Books 
 The Golden World (1986) Bantam Books 
 The City in the Mist (1987) Bantam Books 
 The Return (1988) Bantam Books 
 The Star Explorer (1988) Bantam Books

Westerns 
 Dos Caballos (1989, Hugh Zachary) M. Evans

Sheriff Jugg Watson western series 
 Bloodrush (1981, Hugh Zachary) Leisure  – A string of killings in Earlysberg, a quiet Southern town, seem to suggest ritual voodoo and black magic.
 Murder In White (1981, Hugh Zachary) Leisure

Tusk Smith western series 
 To Guard the Right (1981, Hugh Zachary) Worldwide Library (Raven House) 
 Top Level Death (1981, Hugh Zachary) Worldwide Library (Raven House)

The Sierra Leone romance/western series
 Flight To Freedom (1981, Hugh Zachary) Dell 
 Freedom's Passion (1981, Hugh Zachary) Dell 
 Treasure of Hope (1982, Hugh Zachary) Dell 
 Freedom's Victory (1982, Hugh Zachary) Dell

Romance novels 
 Love and Battle (1980, Hugh & Elizabeth Zachary) Ballantine

Nonfiction 
 The Beachcomber's Handbook of Seafood Cookery (1969, Hugh Zachary) John F. Blair 
 Wild Card Poker (1976, Hugh Zachary) Stephen Green Press

References

External links
 
 Fantastic Fiction Home
 Interview with Hugh and Elizabeth Zachary, March 27, 1998, transcription of an oral history interview from UNCW Archives and Special Collections Online Database

1928 births
2016 deaths
20th-century American novelists
American male novelists
American science fiction writers
20th-century American male writers